The 2020 Liga Profesional de Primera División season, also known as the Campeonato Uruguayo de Primera División 2020, was the 117th season of the Uruguayan Primera División, Uruguay's top-flight football league, and the 90th in which it is professional. The season, named as "Néstor "Tito" Gonçalves", began on 15 February 2020 and ended on 7 April 2021. Nacional were the defending champions, having won the title in the previous season and successfully defended their title in this season by defeating Rentistas in the finals by a 4–0 score on aggregate, thus claiming their 48th Primera División title.

The competition was suspended from 13 March to 8 August 2020 due to the COVID-19 pandemic.

Teams

The three lowest placed teams in the relegation table of the 2019 season, Racing, Rampla Juniors, and Juventud, were relegated to the Segunda División for the 2020 season. They were replaced by Montevideo City Torque, Deportivo Maldonado, and Rentistas, who were promoted from the Segunda División.

Managerial changes

Effects of the COVID-19 pandemic
On 12 March 2020, Uruguayan Football Association president Ignacio Alonso announced that the fourth round of the Torneo Apertura, scheduled for the weekend of 14–15 March, would be played behind closed doors. In his statement through social media, Alonso said that the decision had been made in conjunction with the Uruguayan government in conversations with President Luis Lacalle Pou and National Secretary for Sport Sebastián Bauzá. However, the next day, following the suspension of all public events until further notice ordered by the Uruguayan government due to the COVID-19 pandemic, the AUF announced the indefinite suspension of all of its tournaments, including the Primera División.

On 22 May, the health protocol elaborated by the AUF in conjunction with four physicians was approved by 13 out of the 16 Primera División clubs. On 4 June, Uruguay's Ministry of Public Health approved the health protocol submitted by AUF on 26 May for the return of activity. The protocol contemplated the application of COVID-19 tests in every club from 8 to 10 June, and the start of individual training on 15 June, with the competition being set to resume between 1 and 15 August, pending final approval from the Uruguayan government. 

Despite the AUF's efforts to resume competition on 1 August, on 15 July, following a meeting between representatives from the Uruguayan government and the governing body, it was confirmed that the tournament would resume on 8 August 2020.

On 26 September, the match between Liverpool and Nacional scheduled for that same day was suspended due to the presence of one positive COVID-19 case in Nacional's squad, which prompted the Ministry of Public Health to decree a mandatory quarantine for the entire team. The match was eventually rescheduled by AUF to 3 October.

The fifth round of the Torneo Intermedio, originally scheduled to be held in the weekend of 14–15 November, was postponed after the entire squads of Danubio and Boston River were forced to isolate by health authorities due to Danubio footballer Rodrigo Piñeiro testing positive for COVID-19. Further Torneo Intermedio matches involving Danubio, Defensor Sporting, and Rentistas, as well as the tournament's final between Nacional and Montevideo Wanderers were also postponed due to the confirmation of COVID-19 cases in those teams.

With the repeated suspensions and postponements of matches and rounds of the tournament due to the COVID-19 pandemic causing the extension of the 2020 season to April 2021, meaning that the league would not be concluded before the start of the Copa Libertadores and Copa Sudamericana qualifying stages, on 14 January 2021 the League Council of the Uruguayan Football Association approved a temporary modification to the method of qualification to CONMEBOL competitions of Uruguayan clubs. Since associations must formally inform CONMEBOL of the clubs that will take part in international competition in advance to the start of competition, some international berths were decided based on deadlines set according to the dates the respective Copa Libertadores and Copa Sudamericana rounds were scheduled to be held on as well as the placements of clubs in the aggregate table at the time of those deadlines.

In that vein, the Uruguay 4 and Uruguay 3 berths to the Copa Libertadores, which are usually awarded to the best clubs in the aggregate table other than the league champions and runners-up, were awarded to the best eligible clubs in the aggregate table as of 7 and 21 February 2021, respectively, considering that the Copa Libertadores first and second stages were scheduled to begin on 23 February and 9 March 2021, respectively. In all cases, clubs were offered the chance to accept or decline the berths they were eligible for at the time of the respective deadlines.

Torneo Apertura
The Torneo Apertura, named "Sr. Mateo Giri", was the first tournament of the 2020 season. It began on 15 February and concluded on 14 October 2020.

Standings

Results

Torneo Apertura decider
Since Nacional and Rentistas ended up tied in points for first place, an additional match was played by both teams to decide the Torneo Apertura winners. The winners qualified for the semifinal of the championship playoff.

Torneo Intermedio
The Torneo Intermedio was the second tournament of the 2020 season, played between the Apertura and Clausura tournaments. It consisted of two groups whose composition depended on the final standings of the Torneo Apertura: teams in odd-numbered positions played in Serie A, and teams in even-numbered positions played in Serie B. It started on 17 October 2020 and ended on 14 January 2021, with the winners being granted a berth into the 2021 Copa Sudamericana and the 2021 Supercopa Uruguaya.

Serie A

Serie B

Torneo Intermedio Final

Torneo Clausura
The Torneo Clausura, named "Sr. Julio César Road", was the third and last tournament of the 2020 season. Due to the schedule disruptions caused by the COVID-19 pandemic, there was a proposal to change its format and play it with two groups of eight teams, akin to the Torneo Intermedio, however on 23 December 2020 the AUF's League Council decided to play it under its normal single-round robin format. It began on 16 January 2021 and ended on 29 March 2021.

Standings

Results

Aggregate table
The aggregate table included the results of the three stages played throughout the season: Torneo Apertura, Torneo Intermedio, and Torneo Clausura. The top team of this table at the end of the season qualified for the finals of the championship playoff.

Championship playoff

Semi-final

Finals

Nacional won 4–0 on aggregate.

Top goalscorers
{| class="wikitable" border="1"
|-
! Rank
! Name
! Club
! Goals
|-
| align=center | 1
| Gonzalo Bergessio
|Nacional
| align=center | 25
|-
| align=center | 2
| Juan Ignacio Ramírez
|Liverpool
| align=center | 24
|-
| align=center | 3
| Maureen Franco
|Fénix
| align=center | 18
|-
| align=center | 4
| David Terans
|Peñarol
| align=center | 16
|-
| align=center | 5
| Gonzalo Vega
|Rentistas
| align=center | 15
|-
| align=center | 6
| Facundo Batista
|Deportivo Maldonado
| align=center | 14
|-
| align=center | 7
| Matías Arezo
|River Plate
| align=center | 13
|-
| rowspan=2 align=center | 8
| Enzo Borges
|Cerro Largo
| rowspan=2 align=center | 12
|-
| Matías Cóccaro
|Montevideo City Torque
|-
| rowspan=3 align=center | 10
| Agustín Álvarez Martínez
|Peñarol
| rowspan=3 align=center | 10
|-
| Rubén Bentancourt
|Boston River
|-
| Gustavo Del Prete
|Montevideo City Torque
|}

Source: AUF

Relegation
Relegation was determined at the end of the season by computing an average of the number of points earned per game over the two most recent seasons: 2019 and 2020. The three teams with the lowest average were relegated to the Segunda División for the following season.

Season awards
On 23 April 2021 the AUF announced the winners of the season awards, who were chosen by its Technical Staff based on voting by managers and captains of the 16 Primera División teams as well as a group of local sports journalists. 37 players were nominated for Best Player and the Team of the Season according to their ratings and evaluations by the Technical Staff throughout the season.

References

External links
Asociación Uruguaya de Fútbol - Campeonato Uruguayo 

2020
2020 in Uruguayan football
2021 in Uruguayan football
Uruguay
Uruguay